Tetragonoderus sticticus is a species of beetle in the family Carabidae. It was described by Wilhelm Ferdinand Erichson in 1847.

References

sticticus
Beetles described in 1847